The Puduari River is a river in the state of Amazonas, Brazil. It is a tributary of the Rio Negro.

Course

The river runs in a northeast direction to join the right bank of the Rio Negro to the north of the town of Novo Airão.
It forms the boundary between the Rio Negro State Park North Section on its left (north west) bank and the Rio Negro Right Bank Environmental Protection Area along its right (south east) bank.
The terra firma forest in the river basin has abundant Manicaria saccifera palms.

Fauna

The river is a blackwater river, as are the nearby Rio Negro tributaries the Unini, Jaú and Carabinani rivers, and has similar fauna and flora to those rivers.
Forty species of fish have been recorded in the river and thirty species in the streams that feed it from the state park.
The most common species in the river are Auchenipterichthys longimanus, Ageneiosus species, Bryconops species, Cyphocharax abramoides, Serrasalmus gouldingi and Hemiodus goeldi, while the most common species in the streams are Bryconops species, Hemigrammus pretoensis, Pyrrhulina brevis, Copella nigrofasciata, Microcharacidium eleotrioides and Poeciloharax weitzmani.

See also
List of rivers of Amazonas

Notes

Sources

Rivers of Amazonas (Brazilian state)
Tributaries of the Rio Negro (Amazon)